The Chiku bent-toed gecko (Cyrtodactylus hidupselamanya)  is a species of gecko that is endemic to peninsular Malaysia.

References 

Cyrtodactylus
Reptiles described in 2016